In mathematics, Milnor K-theory is an algebraic invariant (denoted  for a field ) defined by  as an attempt to study higher algebraic K-theory in the special case of fields. It was hoped this would help illuminate the structure for algebraic  and give some insight about its relationships with other parts of mathematics, such as Galois cohomology and the Grothendieck–Witt ring of quadratic forms. Fortunately, it can be shown Milnor  is a part of algebraic , which in general is the easiest part to compute.

Definition

Motivation 
After the definition of the Grothendieck group  of a commutative ring, it was expected there should be an infinite set of invariants  called higher  groups, from the fact there exists a short exact sequence

which should have a continuation by a long exact sequence. Note the group on the left is relative . This led to much study and as a first guess for what this theory would look like, Milnor gave a definition for fields. Then, if in a later generalization of algebraic  was given, if the generators of  lived in degree  and the relations in degree , then the constructions in degrees  and  would give the structure for the rest of the  ring. Under this assumption, Milnor gave his "ad-hoc" definition. It turns out the natural map  fails to be injective for a global field pg 96.

Definition 
Note for fields the Grothendieck group can be readily computed as  since the only finitely generated modules are finite-dimensional vector spaces. Also, Milnor's definition of higher  depends upon the canonical isomorphism

(the group of units of ) and observing the calculation of K2 of a field by Hideya Matsumoto, which gave the simple presentation

for a two-sided ideal generated by elements , called Steinberg relations. Milnor took the hypothesis that these were the only relations, hence he gave the following "ad-hoc" definition of Milnor K-theory as

The direct sum of these groups is isomorphic to a tensor algebra over the integers of the multiplicative group  modded out by the two-sided ideal generated by:

so

showing his definition is a direct extension of the Steinberg relations.

Properties

Ring structure 
The graded module  is a graded-commutative ringpg 1-3. If we write

as

From the proof of this property, there are some additional properties which fall out, like  for  since . Also, if  of non-zero fields elements equals , then  There's a direct arithmetic application:  is a sum of squares if and only if every positive dimensional  is nilpotent, which is a powerful statement about the structure of Milnor . In the converse case, the field  can be embedded into a real closed field, which gives a total ordering on the field.

Relation to Higher Chow groups and Quillen's higher K-theory 
The second main property to show is the Steinberg relations. With these, and the fact the higher Chow groups have a ring structure  we get an explicit map  Showing the map in the reverse direction is an isomorphism is more work, but we get the isomorphisms  We can then relate the higher Chow groups to higher algebraic K-theory using the fact there are isomorphisms  giving the relation to Quillen's higher algebraic K-theory. Note that the maps

from the Milnor K-groups of a field to the Daniel Quillen K-groups, which is an isomorphism for  but not for larger n, in general. Every element of Milnor K-theory can be written as a finite sum of symbols.

Representation in motivic cohomology 
In motivic cohomology, specifically motivic homotopy theory, there is a sheaf  representing a generalization of Milnor K-theory with coefficients in an abelian group . It can be shown there is an -weak equivalence with the motivic Eilenberg-Maclane sheaves  (depending on the grading convention).

Examples

Finite fields 
For a finite field ,  is a cyclic group of order  (since is it isomorphic to ), so graded commutativity gives  hence  Because  is a finite group, this implies it must have order .

Real numbers 
For the field of real numbers  the Milnor  groups can be readily computed. The Milnor K-theory ring is important in the study of motivic homotopy theory because it gives generators for part of the motivic Steenrod algebra. The others are lifts from the classical Steenrod operations to motivic cohomology.

Other calculations 
 is an uncountable uniquely divisible group. For , . The full proof is in the appendix of Milnor's original paper. Some of the computation can be seen by looking at a map on  induced from the inclusion of a global field  to its completions , so there is a morphism whose kernel finitely generated.

In addition, for a general local field  (such as a finite extension ), the Milnor   are divisible.

K*M(F(t)) 
This follows from the theorem there exists only one homomorphism  which for the group of units  which are elements have valuation , having a natural morphism  where  we have  where  a prime element, meaning , and  Since every non-zero prime ideal  gives a valuation , we get the map  on the Milnor K-groups.

Applications
Milnor K-theory plays a fundamental role in higher class field theory, replacing  in the one-dimensional class field theory.

Milnor K-theory fits into the broader context of motivic cohomology, via the isomorphism

of the Milnor K-theory of a field with a certain motivic cohomology group. In this sense, the apparently ad hoc definition of Milnor  becomes a theorem: certain motivic cohomology groups of a field can be explicitly computed by generators and relations.

A much deeper result, the Bloch-Kato conjecture (also called the norm residue isomorphism theorem), relates Milnor  to Galois cohomology or étale cohomology:

for any positive integer r invertible in the field F. This conjecture was proved by Vladimir Voevodsky, with contributions by Markus Rost and others.

Finally, there is a relation between Milnor K-theory and quadratic forms. For a field F of characteristic not 2, define the fundamental ideal I in the Witt ring of quadratic forms over F to be the kernel of the homomorphism  given by the dimension of a quadratic form, modulo 2. Milnor defined a homomorphism:

where  denotes the class of the n-fold Pfister form.

Dmitri Orlov, Alexander Vishik, and Voevodsky proved another statement called the Milnor conjecture, namely that this homomorphism  is an isomorphism.

See also 

 Azumaya algebra
 Motivic homotopy theory

References

External links 

 Some aspects of the functor  of fields
 About Tate's computation of 

K-theory